The 2022–23 Colorado Buffaloes women's basketball team represented the University of Colorado Boulder during the 2022–23 NCAA Division I women's basketball season. The Buffaloes, led by seventh year head coach JR Payne, played their home games at the CU Events Center and compete as members of the Pac-12 Conference.

Previous season 
The Buffaloes finished the season 22–9, 9–7 in Pac-12 play to finish in fifth place. As the fifth seed in the Pac-12 women's tournament they defeated Washington in the first round, Arizona in the quarterfinals before losing to Stanford in the semifinals.  They received an automatic bid to the NCAA Women's Tournament as a 7th seed in the Greensboro Region where they got upset by 10th seed Creighton in the first round.

The Buffaloes were the last undefeated DI women's college basketball in the 2021-22 season, losing their first game to #2 Stanford on January 14, 2022.

Offseason

Departures

Incoming

Recruiting
There were no recruiting classing class of 2022.

Recruiting class of 2023

Roster

Schedule

|-
!colspan=9 style=| Exhibition

|-
!colspan=9 style=| Regular season

|-
!colspan=9 style=| Pac-12 Women's Tournament

|-
!colspan=12 style=|NCAA tournament

Source:

Rankings
 

*The preseason and week 1 polls were the same.^Coaches did not release a week 2 poll.

Notes

References 

Colorado Buffaloes women's basketball seasons
Colorado
Colorado Buffaloes
Colorado Buffaloes
Colorado